Tollius is a genus of broad-headed bugs in the family Alydidae. There are at least four described species in Tollius.

Species
These four species belong to the genus Tollius:
 Tollius curtulus (Stål, 1859)
 Tollius quadratus Van Duzee, 1921
 Tollius setosus Van Duzee, 1906
 Tollius vanduzeei Torre-Bueno, 1940

References

Alydinae
Pentatomomorpha genera